Dinitroanilines are a class of chemical compounds with the chemical formula C6H5N3O4.  They are derived from both aniline and dinitrobenzenes.  There are six isomers: 2,3-dinitroaniline, 2,4-dinitroaniline, 2,5-dinitroaniline, 2,6-dinitroaniline, 3,4-dinitroaniline, and 3,5-dinitroaniline.

Dinitroanilines are intermediates in the preparation of various industrially important chemicals including dyes and pesticides.  Herbicides which are derivatives of dinitroanilines include benfluralin, butralin, chlornidine, dinitramine, dipropalin, ethalfluralin, fluchloralin, isopropalin, methalpropalin, nitralin, oryzalin, pendimethalin, prodiamine, profluralin, and trifluralin.

2,4-Dinitroaniline can be prepared by reaction of 1-chloro-2,4-dinitrobenzene with ammonia or by acid hydrolysis of 2,4-dinitroacetanilide.

Dinitroanilines are explosive and flammable with heat or friction.

Dinitroanilines were developed prior to 2015 by, among others, the Dow Chemical Company, who then sold their business to privately-held Gowan Company.

References

Anilines
Nitrobenzenes